The 2016 Individual Speedway World Championship Grand Prix Qualification was a series of motorcycle speedway meetings used to determine the three riders who qualified for the 2016 Speedway Grand Prix. The series consisted of four qualifying rounds at Goričan, St Johann, Lonigo and Abensberg, two semi-finals at Terenzano and Riga and then the Grand Prix Challenge at Rybnik. The three riders that qualified were Bartosz Zmarzlik, Piotr Pawlicki Jr. and Chris Harris.

Qualifying rounds

Semi-finals

Final

See also 
 2015 Speedway Grand Prix

References 

2015 in speedway
2016 Speedway Grand Prix
Speedway Grand Prix Qualifications